Fort Shirley was a fort erected by the Province of Pennsylvania during the French and Indian War.

History
Before the construction of Fort Shirley, a small trading post built by George Croghan was located at the site.  In September 1755, Croghan fortified the post to repel Native Americans after General Edward Braddock's defeat at the Battle of the Monongahela.  A few months later, the post was taken over by Pennsylvania.  The post became a small fort that would protect villagers against attacking Natives, and would be a launching point for militia expeditions.  Shirley along with Forts Granville, Lyttelton and Patterson formed a defensive chain that stretched from the lower Juniata River and Aughwick Creek valleys.

After Braddock's defeat, these forts came under attack by several Native tribes, as well as French troops.  The worst of these attacks came at Fort Granville on August 3, 1756 when Louis Coulon de Villiers succeeded in taking the outpost, and in the process killed the lieutenant in charge of the fort.

Fort Shirley was abandoned shortly after the destruction of Fort Granville, but not before John Armstrong led a 300 man expedition from the fort to attack the Native American base of operations at Kittanning.

References cited 

1937. Souvenir Historical Book,  Sesqui-Centennial Celebration of Huntingdon County, Pennsylvania. Huntingdon County Historical Society, Huntingdon, PA.

Africa, J.S.  1883.  History of Huntingdon County Pennsylvania.  Huntingdon County Historical Society, Huntingdon, PA.

Burns, Jonathan A.,  Drobnock, George John, and  Smith, Jared M. 2008. Croghan at Aughwick:  History, Maps, and Archaeology Collide in the Search for Fort Shirley. Paper Presented Pioneer America Society October 2008.

Coe, M. D. 2006. The Line of Forts: Historical Archaeology on the Colonial Frontier of Massachusetts. University Press of New England, Hanover.

Donehoo, George P., Indian Villages and Place Names in Pennsylvania, The Telegraph Press, Harrisburg, PA, 1928

Hannah, C. A.  1911.  The Wilderness Trail, vols. I and II.  G. P. Putnam's Sons, New York

Hazard, Samuel.  1851.  Pennsylvania Archives, vol. II.  Joseph Severns and Co., Philadelphia, PA.

Hazard, Samuel.  1878.  Pennsylvania Archives, vol. VI.  Joseph Severns and Co., Philadelphia, PA.

Hazard, Samuel.  1851.  The Pennsylvania Colonial Records, vol. VI, Minutes of the Provincial Council of Pennsylvania.  Theodore Fenn and Co., Harrisburg, PA.

Hunter W. A.  1960.  Forts on the Pennsylvania Frontier, 1753-1758.  The Pennsylvania Historical and Museum Commission, Harrisburg, PA.

Jordan, J.W.  1936.  A History of the Juniata River Valley in Three Volumes, vol. III.  National Historical Association, Harrisburg, PA.

Lytle, M.S.  1876.  History of Huntingdon County, in the state of Pennsylvania:  from the earliest times to the centennial anniversary of American independence, July 4, 1876.  W.H. Roy Publishers, Lancaster, PA.

Supreme Court of Pennsylvania.  1871.  [1818] Armstrong, Armstrong, and Duncan v. Morgan.  In, Reports of Cases Adjudged in the Supreme Court of Pennsylvania, Vol. III.  JNO. Campbell, Philadelphia.

Waddel,  Louis M. and Bomberger, Bruce D. 1996.  The French and Indian War In Pennsylvania, 1753–1763.  Pennsylvania Historical and Museum Commission, Commonwealth of Pennsylvania, Harrisburg, PA.

Weiser, J. G.  1916.  The Frontier Forts in the Cumberland and Juniata Valleys.  In, Report of the Commission to Locate the Site of the Frontier Forts of Pennsylvania, Vol. I, edited by T.L. Montgomery.  W. S. Ray, State Printer, Harrisburg, PA.

References

Sources 
Volwiler, Albert T.  1926.  George Croghan and the Westward Movement, 1741-1782.  Arthur H. Clarke and Co., Cleveland, OH.
Waddell, Louis M, and Bruce D. Bomberger, The French and Indian War in Pennsylvania 1753-1763, Commonwealth of Pennsylvania., 1996, .
Wainwright, Nicholas B. 1959. George Croghan, Wilderness Diplomat. University of North Carolina Press, Chapel Hill, N.C.

Shirley
Shirley
Pre-statehood history of Pennsylvania